Ekspress Grupp is an Estonian media and publishing company. The company's two main segments are: media segment and printing service segment.

The media segment encompasses, for example, online portal Delfi, several other news portals, publishing of newspapers, books, and magazines in Estonia. The printing service segment includes Printall AS. In 2021, it was decided to sell the Printall printing house.

The company is established on 21 June 1995.

Ekspress Grupp's main subsidiaries are: AS Ekspress Meedia, A/S Delfi, UAB Delfi, SIA Biļešu Paradize, AS Õhtuleht Kirjastus, Adnet Media UAB, SIA Altero, Babahh Media OÜ, Kinnisvarakeskkond OÜ, Linna Ekraanid OÜ, SIA D Screens, OÜ Hea Lugu, AS Printall, AS Express Post. In the past, the Ekspress Grupp owned the Estonian information telephone Ekspress Hotline and the bookstore chain Rahva Raamat.

Since 2007, the company is listed in Nasdaq Tallinn.

As of November 17, 2011, Hans H. Luik's holding company HHL Rühm OÜ owned 27.01% of Ekspress Group's shares, and Hans H. Luik as a private individual owned 26.72% of Ekspress Group's shares.

References

External links
 

Companies of Estonia